Janis Mars Wunderlich (born 1970) is a ceramic artist, currently an assistant professor of art at Monmouth College.

Wunderlich was born in Akron, Ohio and received a BFA from Brigham Young University and an MFA from Ohio State University. As she raised five children, Wunderlich established an art career both in the gallery and as a professor. 
As of 2020, she is an assistant professor of art history, ceramics, and art foundations at Monmouth College in Monmouth, Illinois.

Art

Wunderlich's preferred mediums are clay and printmaking. Her work is a distinctive mix of styles and themes and a special emphasis on motherhood. She has been the recipient of fellowships from the Ohio Arts Council and the Greater Columbus Arts Council. She spent a summer in Dresden, Germany on a residency studying modern and historic techniques of porcelain figurine manufacturing at the Meissen Factory in Meissen, Germany. She has been featured in Ceramics Monthly, The Best of New Ceramic Art, 500 Figures in Clay, and Dialogue Journal. In 2019, Wunderlich premiered her exhibit "Deep" in the Western Illinois University's Heating Plant Annex Gallery.

Recognition 
She was profiled in a documentary Who Does She Think She Is? about the societal push for women to choose between art and motherhood and the struggle five female artists (Maye Torres, Angela Williams, Camille Musser, Mayumi Oda and Janis Mars Wunderlich) face in reconciling both parts of their lives. The New York Times said of her part in the film, “Janis Wunderlich, on the other hand, seems cheerfully adept at managing five children, a husband and a successful career as a sculptor.”

Personal life
Wunderlich is the mother of five children. Wunderlich is a member of the Church of Jesus Christ of Latter-day Saints. She is also a Boston-qualifying marathon runner.

As she raised her children, Wunderlich located her studio in the corner of her dining room so she was only a few steps from access to her art. She would work in the early mornings, during nap times, and after children went to bed.

References

External links
Janis Mars Wunderlich Official Website

Latter Day Saints from Ohio
Living people
Brigham Young University alumni
1970 births
Ohio State University alumni
21st-century American women artists